Kruchowo  is a village in the administrative district of Gmina Trzemeszno, within Gniezno County, Greater Poland Voivodeship, in west-central Poland.

The village has a population of 1,064.

References

Kruchowo